Frank Rowland (1 March 1892 – 25 February 1957) was an Australian cricketer. He played one first-class match for New South Wales in 1924/25.

See also
 List of New South Wales representative cricketers

References

External links
 

1892 births
1957 deaths
Australian cricketers
New South Wales cricketers
People from New England (New South Wales)
Cricketers from New South Wales